Anthony Denis "Tony" Thomopoulos is an American motion picture and television executive. Thomopoulos spent 12 years of his career at ABC, moving progressively from Vice President of Prime Time Programs, to President of ABC Entertainment, to President of ABC Broadcast Group.

Biography
The son of Greek immigrants, he grew up in the Bronx. His dad owned a restaurant, young Tony was raised in the Greek Orthodox Church. After a high school aptitude test marked Thomopoulos as a potential diplomat, he applied to Georgetown University's Edmund A. Walsh School of Foreign Service. But while at the Washington university, he got interested in business instead. His first job out of college was as a mail clerk at NBC's New York headquarters.

Business career
In 1973, Barry Diller hired Thomopoulos at ABC to oversee prime-time programming. He was noted, among other things, for the tough position he took in dealing with the contract holdout of Suzanne Somers on the hit ABC show Three's Company, and for his quick cancellation of the 1982 cult favorite Police Squad!, explaining that the show had been cancelled because, among other reasons, "it required constant attention". In June 1983, he was named president of the broadcast group. He resigned as president in 1985 and became chairman of United Artists Pictures, where he supervised such productions as Betrayed, Baby Boom, and The Living Daylights. In 1989, Thomopoulos formed Thomopoulos Productions, an independent production company of both motion pictures and television programs. 

From 1991 to 1995, he was President of Amblin Television, a division of Amblin Entertainment. He was responsible for the original placement of NBC's highly acclaimed program ER, in addition to several other successful series on network television.  In 1995, Thomopoulos joined International Family Entertainment, Inc. (IFE). His responsibilities included all aspects of programming for The Family Channel. He was named CEO of MTM Entertainment, Inc., a subsidiary of IFE, and was also responsible for all aspects of MTM Television and MTM Distribution.

Thomopoulos was Chairman and CEO of artist Thomas Kinkade's Media Arts Group from June 2001 to January 2004. He subsequently founded Morning Light Productions.

Personal life 
Thomopoulos's first marriage ended in 1983 after 22 years, and produced three children. In 1985 he married television host Cristina Ferrare. They have two children, Arianna (born 1989) and Alexandra (born 1986). As of 2011 they lived in California.

References

External links

Witness to History: Anthony “Tony” Thomopoulos (F’59), Georgetown University interview, November 12, 2008 (video)

Living people
Walsh School of Foreign Service alumni
American people of Greek descent
People from the Bronx
Place of birth missing (living people)
Year of birth missing (living people)
American media executives
American Broadcasting Company executives
Presidents of American Broadcasting Company Entertainment